David Edward Parry (born 11 February 1948) is an English footballer, who played as a winger in the Football League for Tranmere Rovers and Halifax Town. He also played 17 Northern Premier League games for Wigan Athletic.

References

Tranmere Rovers F.C. players
Halifax Town A.F.C. players
English Football League players
Wigan Athletic F.C. players
Blackpool F.C. players
Association football wingers
Living people
1948 births
English footballers